Bacillus aerius is a species of bacteria first isolated from cryogenic tubes used for collecting air samples from high altitudes, hence its name. Its type strain is 24KT (=MTCC 7303T =JCM 13348T).

References

Further reading

External links

LPSN

aerius
Bacteria described in 2006